Solenostemma is a group of plants in the family Apocynaceae first described as a genus in 1825. It contains only one known species, Solenostemma argel, native to North Africa and the Arabian Peninsula.

The leaves are used in herbal medicine for the treatment of some diseases such as of liver and kidney and allergies. It is used as incense in the treatment of measles and sometimes crushed and used as remedy for suppurating wounds. The leaves are infused to treat gastro-intestinal cramps, stomach-ache, colic, cold and urinary tract infections and is effective as an anti-syphilitic if used for prolonged periods of 40–80 days. Leaves possess purgative properties which may be due to the latex present in the stems. Several active compounds have been extracted from Solenostemma.

The native Sudanese have commonly used Solenostemma argel to suppress stomach pain, pains due to childbirth, and loss of appetite.

The word is used in the book called "أرض السودان" written by Amîr Tâdj as sirr.
The Arabic word is حرجل
formerly included
moved to Cynanchum 
 Solenostemma acutum (L.) Wehmer, synonym of Cynanchum acutum L. 
 Solenostemma oleifolium (Neck.) Bullock & E.A.Bruce, synonym of  Cynanchum oleifolium Nectoux

References

Asclepiadoideae
Flora of North Africa
Flora of the Arabian Peninsula
Monotypic Apocynaceae genera
Plants used in traditional African medicine